The Heinkel He 277 was a four-engine, long-range heavy bomber design, originating as a derivative of the He 177, intended for production and use by the German Luftwaffe during World War II. The main difference was in its engines. The He 177 used two Daimler-Benz DB 606 "power system" engines, each of which consisted of two combined Daimler-Benz DB 601 engines, each DB 606 weighed 1.5 tons. The He 177A-3 and its successors used two DB 610 "power system" engines, each of which consisted of two combined Daimler-Benz DB 605 engines, each DB 610 weighed 1.5 tons. Due to problems with both the DB 606 and the DB 610, the He 277 was intended to use four unitized BMW 801E 14-cylinder radial engines, each mounted in an individual nacelle and each turning a three-blade, four-meter diameter propeller.

The design was never produced and no prototype airframe was completed. The deteriorating condition of the German aviation industry late in the war and the competition from other long-range bomber designs from other firms, led to the design being cancelled. Although not specifically intended for it at first, partially due to the time-frame in the spring of 1942 in which its ultimate niche was requested for by the Reichsluftfahrtministerium (RLM), the He 277 design became Heinkel's entry in the important trans-oceanic range Amerikabomber competition, struggling to compete against other designs from rival firms in the competition for a truly trans-oceanic ranged bomber for the Luftwaffe.

The "He 177B" versus He 277 controversy
For many years after the war, a substantial number of aviation history books and magazine articles that dealt with late World War II German military aviation developments consistently stated that Reichsmarschall Hermann Göring, early in World War II, was becoming so frustrated by the 177A's ongoing engine problems, caused by the twin DB 606 "coupled" powerplants selected for the He 177A design in the pre-war years, that he forbade Ernst Heinkel from doing any work on a separately four-engined version of the 177 airframe, or even mentioning a new "He 277" design with four separate engines – by one account, in the late autumn of 1941 – until Heinkel brought the disagreement directly to Adolf Hitler, who supposedly not only approved of calling the new, separately engined version of the 177 the "He 277", but overruled Göring's prohibition on working on the design (previously called the "He 177B" by Heinkel as a "cover designation" to hide its existence from Göring, and the RLM.)

Statements by Göring himself in August 1942 in response to Oberst Edgar Petersen's reports - in his capacity as the Kommandeur der Erprobungstellen (commander of all Luftwaffe test stations), themselves headquartered at Erprobungsstelle Rechlin - on solving the serious problems with the original Heinkel He 177A's powerplants, however, seem to directly contradict elements of the oft-repeated story, as those statements seem to show that Göring thought that the He 177A actually had four separate engines, and in late August 1942 Göring derisively labeled the He 177A's coupled engine arrangements, the 1.5 tonnes-apiece DB 606 and DB 610 "power systems" at that time as monstrous zusammengeschweißte Motoren, or "welded-together engines", in his complaints about the He 177A's ongoing engine difficulties, and was anxious to see a truly four-engined version of Heinkel's heavy bomber fully developed and in production. The earliest-dated initiative to be undertaken by Ernst Heinkel himself to trial a true "four-engined" design format for the original He 177 dated back to 17 November 1938, before the construction of the He 177 V3 and V4 prototype airframes had even been started, when Heinkel had personally asked the RLM to set aside the He 177 V3 and V4 airframes for a trial installation of four separate unitized Junkers Jumo 211 powerplants to overcome the concerns that the RLM Technischen-Amt technical department's director Ernst Udet and Heinkel had expressed about the RLM's specific dive-bombing priority for the He 177A, but was turned down for the trial fitment.

Facts that could have fostered the origin of the post-war aviation book storyline about the "He 177B"/He 277" controversy were that the RLM, in listing the He 177 development projects that they approved of the Heinkel firm doing work on as of February 1943 — six months after Göring's recorded engine complaint statements, and 18 months after the first-ever consideration by the RLM for any He 177 proposed variant to have four "individual" powerplants, as the paper-only "He 177H" high-altitude predecessor to the later He 274 in October 1941, only included the He 177 A-5 heavy bomber, A-6 high-altitude bomber, A-7 long-range version, and the "He 277" itself, defining the February 1943 date as the earliest reliable date of any official German government mention of such an "He 277"-designated aircraft, as this date also indicates the time by which the RLM had issued the Heinkel firm the 8-277 airframe design number for the project. The RLM was also expecting, during the late spring of 1943 — about one year after the mid-Spring 1942 Amerikabomber proposal first arrived in Göring's offices — that a trio of He 277 V-series prototype aircraft, and construction of ten pre-production He 277A-0 series service test machines were to be completed, as well as "progressive development" of the still-unbuilt and unfinalized design, were anticipated as coming from Heinkel's Schwechat southern plant complex in Austria. The initial starting place for the He 277's fuselage design had been meant to originate with the last "coupled-engine" proposed variant of the He 177 itself, the long-range A-7, which itself was to be the basis for a four-engined variant of the Greif as the He 177A-10, then redesignated the He 177B-7 in the late summer of 1943, as both the A-7 and B-7 had omitted the manned rear dorsal turret of the earlier A-series versions for lighter weight. The considerable changes in the He 277's overall design philosophy evolved after the Amerikabomber proposal's emergence in May 1942, from the changes in the He 277's general arrangement proposal drawings during that time period.  The original proposal, which was meant to use the He 177A-7's fuselage as the starting point, evolved into designing a dedicated, new and wider He 219-general pattern fuselage layout for the 277 from the Spring 1943 timeframe onward, which would be more capable of using a tricycle undercarriage then gaining favor with a few German aviation designers, even with the 277 not known to have been specifically considered by the RLM in the earlier timeframe for the Amerikabomber proposal.

The main factor that seemingly required the lower-drag "coupled" powerplant format for the He 177A, the diving attack mandate by the RLM, which Ernst Heinkel vehemently disagreed with since the original Greif's beginnings in the late 1930s, was rescinded by Göring himself some five months before the "He 277's" earliest-known February 1943 RLM approval date. The Heinkel firm started work on the He 177B as a straightforward, separately four-engined development of the 177A under the B-series designation at least as early as the late summer of 1943, when official Heinkel documents began referring to the He 177B, evidenced from an August 1943-dated,  Heinkel factory-created general arrangement Typenblatt drawing of the He 177 V101 being labeled with the 8-177 RLM designation for the entire line of Greif airframes, and "B-5" elsewhere in the drawing's title block, as a fully RLM approved development of the original He 177 aircraft line, and not in any way directly related to the entirely separate He 277 advanced bomber design project, which by the summer of 1943 was considered to be Heinkel's Amerikabomber aviation contract contender. The first development of the original He 177A to fly with four "individual" engines – using a quartet of He 219-style annular radiators to cool its likely-unitized Daimler-Benz DB 603 powerplants – was the second He 177B prototype, the He 177 V102, on December 20, 1943.

Trio of separate efforts
In total, there were three separate efforts, the movement toward which had been initiated by Ernst Heinkel as early as November 1938, to develop "true four-engined versions" of the A-series Greif: the He 177B, which culminated in four prototype examples being built, with three getting airborne before the war's end; the He 274, of which only two prototypes were started before the end of World War II and completed and flown in France after the war's end; and the He 277, for which only a few airframe parts had been in the process of completion, with no completed prototypes at any time, before or after the end of the war.

Design features

The general arrangement Typenblatt drawings that Heinkel's firm was developing for the He 277 by mid-1943 show an advanced design of heavy bomber, with a 133 square meter area (1,431.6 sq. ft.) "shoulder mount", 40 meter (131 ft 3 in) span wing design, four separate BMW 801E powerplants of 1,471 kW (2,000 PS, 1,973 hp) output each at take-off, with each engine turning a propeller of up to four meters in diameter. The undercarriage options considered for the design included either a fully retracting conventional or nosewheel landing gear, with main gear assemblies that possessed twinned main wheels on each unit, retracting forward (for the nosewheel version, rearwards for a conventional gear arrangement) into the inner engine nacelles. The Heinkel firm's previous experience with designing flightworthy, retractable tricycle undercarriage-equipped airframes extended as far back as late 1939 with the Heinkel He 280 jet fighter prototype, and further strengthened with the unexpectedly successful Heinkel He 219A night fighter, which also used a tricycle undercarriage.

The main crew accommodation of the He 277 consisted of a heavily glazed and "greenhouse"-framed clear view "stepless" cockpit, a common feature of many late-war German bomber airframes and new designs. Immediately aft of the heavily glazed nose, the cockpit glazing over the crew seating and pilot accommodation-enclosing upper section that was blended with the nose glazing's contours, protruding above the 277's forward dorsal fuselage decking level, with a rearward extension atop the fuselage that faired-in the forward upper dorsal turret's forward surface, extending rearwards to just forward of the inner engine cowls. The fuselage outlines themselves were deep, and almost slab-sided in cross-section, with its general sideview profile lines being strongly reminiscent of the smaller He 219 night fighter. This similarity with the 219 even extended to the depictions of the He 277's fuselage-mounted defensive armament emplacements as proposed by Heinkel, with one forward and two aft-facing "steps" along the slightly rounded dorsal and ventral surfaces of the fuselage, much like the smaller night fighter's earliest prototypes had, for the 277's manned aft dorsal and remote aft ventral turret defensive weapons mounts — the aft ventral emplacement being moved rearwards by roughly two meters, in comparison with the early He 219V-series prototypes, to accommodate the aft end of the He 277's bomb bay. The twin tail empennage assembly of the He 219 night fighter was also a likely inspiration for the 277's own similar unit, that added aerodynamic stability when compared to the 177A's single vertical tail — proven to be true from the first flights of the He 177B-series' four-engined He 177 V102 twin-tailed prototype from late December 1943 onwards — and made mounting a powered traversable defensive tail turret easier. Provision was shown on the Heinkel Typenblatt general arrangement drawing for a quartet of ETC-family underwing hardpoint racks, two per wing panel on either side of the outboard pair of BMW 801 engines, potentially allowing  external ordnance loads or drop tanks to extend the bomber's capabilities or range.

In a May 1943 Heinkel factory document showing possible offensive bombload configurations and flight consumable (fuel, etc.) weights for the He 277, two differing bomb bay sizes (interior dimensions of 1.5 x 7.5 meters for the He 277's tailwheel version, and 1.75 x 7.0 meters for the tricycle undercarriage version) were considered, with the latter bomb bay configuration existing within a 1.90 meter width fuselage.

Defensive armament comprised, as envisioned, a five-turret complement of defensive ordnance positions, with only two of these directly manned, and the remainder all remotely operated: a forward, remotely operated Fernbedienbare Drehlafette FDL 151Z "chin turret" under the extreme nose with twin MG 151/20 cannon much as the 177B-series was intended to use, with a 20º "upwards"-tilted axis of traverse in the turret mount design to provide a small degree of elevated fire, twin dorsal turrets – a second remotely operated FDL 151Z forward emplacement, otherwise similar in appearance to the proposed chin turret, and a manned Hydraulische Drehlafette HDL 151Z rear dorsal emplacement – each armed with a pair of MG 151/20 cannon, with both dorsal turrets providing aftwards-section defensive fire upwards and to the sides and rear; an aft remotely operated FDL-family ventral turret for lower rearwards defense, just behind the bomb bay's rear edge with another pair of MG 151/20 cannon with the gunner laying prone, facing rearwards in a starboard-side offset position that possessed a slightly-protruding ventral blister-like gondola for the gunner's position to sight the rear ventral remote turret, and a manned Hecklafette HL 131V tail turret with a quartet of MG 131 heavy machine guns. The Hecklafette four-gun turret had also been planned to be used on some of the other Amerikabomber competing airframes for their own tail-mounted defensive armament, in addition to Heinkel's own A-6 and A-7 proposed versions of the original He 177A airframe, and the nascent He 177B-5 to be in production at Arado Flugzeugwerke by November 1944, and meant to be fitted onto not only the incomplete He 177 V104 B-series "finalized" prototype airframe as the B-5's production prototype, but also a projected "C-version" of the He 219 night fighter. This increasing demand for an advanced "quadmount" gun turret within the Heinkel firm's own range of late-war combat aircraft designs, that had not even been produced by the Borsig firm responsible for it, beyond a small number of test units and engineering mockups led to an alternative twin-cannon "HL 151Z" version to be planned for.  This newly conceived twin-cannon adaptation was meant to use new elevation gun-mount assemblies with the HL 131V's core traverse shell, with each new elevation unit configured to take a single MG 151/20 cannon per turret side. Only a few ground test examples of the twin-cannon variant tail turret had been produced by March 1944.  One of these twin-cannon experimental tail turrets was mounted on an He 177A airframe for testing, possibly any of the He 177 V32 through V34 prototypes already configured to take the original HL 131V turret. Some sideview line drawing depictions of purported "He 277" aircraft, usually in the same aviation history volumes that purveyed the erroneous "He 177B/He 277" storyline, also show what could be an early He 177A-7-based depiction of the later Amerikabomber competitor bearing the He 177A's "Cabin 3" standard cockpit and a quartet of the He 219-derived unitized DB 603 inverted V12 engines actually used on the four He 177B-series prototypes (He 177 V101 through V104) for power, with the abandoned Bugstandlafette BL 131V quadmount remote turret as a "chin turret" in place of the FDL 151Z system as depicted in the Heinkel firm's factory Typenblatt drawings — the BL 131V had already been abandoned in 1943 as too heavy (reducing offensive bombload by a full tonne) and slowing the earlier He 177A airframe by some 30 km/h in top airspeed due to drag, making even the chance of its proposed existence on any He 277 design proposals unlikely.

Competing bomber designs
Throughout the time that the He 277 design was being worked on, Ernst Heinkel was facing competition from other developing heavy bomber designs, and large four-engined aircraft proposals that showed promise as heavy bombers, from Focke-Wulf (the Fw 300, and later, the Ta 400), Junkers (the Ju 390), from Messerschmitt AG (the Me 264), and from his own firm's He 274 four-engined, high-altitude development of the He 177.

The first of these designs that the He 277 was pitted against, mostly to determine the "most producible" bomber that could also be license-built, given Germany's limited aircraft production capacity to arm the Luftwaffe with, and partially to determine the best long-range bomber design to fulfill the needs of the spring 1942-issued Amerikabomber program documents, the Messerschmitt Me 264 ended up being the first design to challenge the He 277's chance for production.  The Me 264 was a purpose-built long-range bomber, using a tricycle landing gear configuration from the start.  The Me 264 prototypes were already flying their test programs with power of exactly the same choice that Heinkel had asked for on November 17, 1938, for the He 177 V3 and V4 prototypes: with four Junkers Jumo 211 engines as early as late December 1942 – a full year after Nazi Germany had declared war on the United States, five months after the Eighth Air Force had begun flying bomber missions against Nazi-occupied France, and two months before the RLM's earliest-known mention of any recorded approval for the He 277 design itself — the later fitment of a quartet of the BMW 801 radials to each example of the trio of Me 264 prototypes also potentially challenged the availability of the same engine design that the He 277 was meant to use, had the Me 264 gone into production with them.

The four-engined Me 264's development, because of the need to use scarce strategic materials in its construction, and because of the better performance estimates that the Focke-Wulf Ta 400 and He 277 possessed, was stopped in May 1943.

Because of the US involvement in the European Theater commencing in mid-August 1942, the Luftwaffe now found that it had a serious need for a well-armed, long-range bomber, which the Luftwaffe found could not be achieved with the 1,120 kW (1,500 hp) class engines it had on hand for such a four-engined bomber. Such ongoing difficulties in developing high-output aviation powerplants of over 1,500 kW apiece, that could be used in combat with proven reliability — which excluded the DB 606 engines of the earlier He 177A variants, which themselves proved to be seriously troublesome from the start of the He 177A's combat service in 1942 — meant that six engines of the under-1,500 kW (2,000 PS) power output levels that they could produce would be needed on a strategic bomber design for a successful mission from Europe to attack the US and safely return to base, with enough of an offensive bombload to be effective, and to have enough defensive firepower for protection to achieve a safe return. It was events on the date of July 3, 1943 that seemed to cement this viewpoint in the RLM's mind – no production decisions on the still-unfinalized He 277's design had emerged by that date, and the continuing problems in Dessau with the high-output Junkers Jumo 222 engine had set back its development, making its use with the He 277, first proposed on that date, even more problematic. The Blohm & Voss firm's aviation division had already settled on six engines with success, as early as 1940, on the prototypes of the BV 222 Wiking flying boat maritime patrol aircraft, itself possessing a substantial 46 meter wingspan, with 255 square meters of area. This emerging need for six engines for such an aircraft was also recognized by Messerschmitt AG, when that firm fielded a paper project for a six-engined "Me 264B", that had a stretched wingspan outwards to 47.5 meters (155 ft 10 in), with two additional BMW 801 radial engines outboard of the existing four powerplants and the same Hecklafette four-gun tail turret as the He 277. Eventually, the Heinkel firm received an order on July 23, 1943 from the Reich Air Ministry's technical department (Technischen Amt) — for Heinkel's engineering shops to design a set of wings for the 277's unfinalized design that could accept a quartet of the troubled Jumo 222 engines, alongside the still "paper-only" concept also being ordered to be designed and buildable with the desired six-engine format the RLM was now favoring for an Amerikabomber, intended to be upwards of a 170 square meter (1,830 sq. ft.) wing area of 45 meter (147 ft 7 in) span to possibly accommodate either four Jumo 222s or six BMW 801s.

In March 1943, Focke-Wulf came up with a six-engined version of their proposed Fw 300 bomber, originally powered with just four BMW 801E radials.  Their more advanced Ta 400 design, first proposed in October 1943 with a tricycle landing gear setup and meant to be powered with a half-dozen of the same engines as the 277 was meant to use, was joined by the Ju 390, a Junkers six-engined version of the developed version of their early-war Junkers Ju 90 airliner, the operational Junkers Ju 290 maritime patrol bomber, and also using six of the same BMW radials as the 277, with both the earlier four-engined A-8 variant of the Ju 290, and the Ju 390A-1 each meant to have a pair of the He 277's Hecklafette quad-gun tail turrets, but with one each in the planned tail position and in a new nose-mount version.

By October 1943, Ernst Heinkel had compared the Messerschmitt and Junkers four-engined designs, and the six-engined BV 222, Ju 390 and Ta 400 designs to his own He 277 project, with the following conclusions:

Of these competing types mentioned by Dr. Heinkel — outside of the thirteen BV 222 six-engined maritime patrol flying boats actually built — only three of the Me 264 design, and a verified pair of the Ju 390 aircraft were ever built, solely as flyable prototypes, and none of these aircraft saw any action against the Allies.

The He 274, because of its own intended high-altitude role, was only a potential competitor with the He 277 for Heinkel's own company engineering and production staff, and the He 274's production had already been outsourced by the end of 1941 to the French Societe Anonyme des Usines Farman, or "SAUF" firm in Suresnes to partially allow Heinkel to work on other projects, like the He 277 and the more advanced Heinkel He 343 jet powered medium bomber design, both of which each had a few airframe components in the process of manufacture for prototype airframes, but with both designs never able to be completed as flyable aircraft.

End of the project
The last competing aircraft design that threatened the He 277's chance for increasingly scarce production capacity was the Junkers Ju 488, a composite of earlier developments of the Junkers Ju 88 twin-engined fast medium bomber design, with a few core components being purpose-designed solely for it, that were brought together to create a four-engined heavy bomber while using already-available components. Two prototype Ju 488s had been completed by the start of the summer of 1944, but were each sabotaged to unairworthy status by the French Resistance by mid-July 1944, before either one had ever been flown.

In April 1944, simultaneously with the four He 177B prototypes either flying (He 177 V101 to V103) or nearing completion (V104) at the Heinkel-Süd facility at Schwechat, the RLM ordered Heinkel to cease any further work on the He 277 project, and all components were also ordered to be scrapped, without any complete examples of the 277 ever having been completed by Heinkel, only three months before the Jägernotprogramm took over all German military aircraft production priorities on July 3, 1944 — with only the Heinkel He 162 Spatz lightweight jet fighter contract winner allowed to progress into production by the RLM from Heinkel's firm from that time forward.

Specifications (He 277 basic configuration)
From Griehl, Manfred and Dressel, Joachim. Heinkel He 177-277-274, Airlife Publishing, Shrewsbury, England 1998, pp. 159 & 184.

not built/completed, design only

See also

References

Bibliography

 Green, William. Warplanes of the Third Reich. London: Macdonald and Jane's Publishers Ltd., 1970 (4th Impression 1979). .
 Griehl, Manfred and Dressel, Joachim. Heinkel He 177-277-274, Airlife Publishing, Shrewsbury, England 1998. . (Primary reference for article)
 Gunston, Bill & Wood, Tony. Hitler's Luftwaffe. London: Salamander Books Ltd., 1977. .
 Wagner, Ray and Nowarra, Heinz. German Combat Planes: A Comprehensive Survey and History of the Development of German Military Aircraft from 1914 to 1945. New York: Doubleday, 1971.

External links

 http://www.century-of-flight.net/Aviation%20history/photo_albums/timeline/ww2/Heinkel%20He%20277.htm  (contains elements from the controversy mentioned at the start of this article)

Abandoned military aircraft projects of Germany
1940s German bomber aircraft
World War II heavy bombers of Germany
He 277